Gorakhpur is a village in Shaheed Bhagat Singh Nagar district of Punjab State, India. The village is administrated by Sarpanch an elected representative of the village.

Demography 
As of 2011, Gorakhpur has a total number of 229 houses and population of 1085 of which 556 include are males while 529 are females according to the report published by Census India in 2011. The literacy rate of Gorakhpur is 81.87%, higher than the state average of 75.84%. The population of children under the age of 6 years is 120 which is 11.06% of total population of Gorakhpur, and child sex ratio is approximately 765 as compared to Punjab state average of 846.

Most of the people are from Schedule Caste which constitutes 2.03% of total population in Gorakhpur. The town does not have any Schedule Tribe population so far.

As per the report published by Census India in 2011, 295 people were engaged in work activities out of the total population of Gorakhpur which includes 269 males and 26 females. According to census survey report 2011, 97.63% workers describe their work as main work and 2.37% workers are involved in Marginal activity providing livelihood for less than 6 months.

Education 
The village has a Punjabi medium, co-ed primary school. The schools does not provide mid-day meal. The school provide free education to children between the ages of 6 and 14 as per Right of Children to Free and Compulsory Education Act. KC Engineering College and Doaba Khalsa Trust Group Of Institutions are the nearest colleges.

Transport 

See also 
List of villages in India

References

External links 
 Tourism of Punjab
 Census of Punjab
 Locality Based PINCode

Villages in Shaheed Bhagat Singh Nagar district